Kazys Naruševičius  (1920–2004) was a Lithuanian painter.

See also
List of Lithuanian painters

References
This articles was initially translated from Lithuanian Wikipedia

1920 births
2004 deaths
20th-century Lithuanian painters
Soviet painters